Great Gangsters From The Dirty District was the self-titled debut EP from French group, Dirty District. it was recorded in 1989, and was later scrapped due to sound problems. 

O.S.K. 
 Watch out

Website
http://www.45toursderockfrancais.net/rockfrancais/dirtydistrict45t.htm includes a sample and artwork.

Dirty District albums